Richard Ambrose Allen (22 December 1921 – 14 August 1977) was an Australian rules footballer who played with Collingwood in the Victorian Football League (VFL).

Allen enlisted in the Australian Army in April 1944 and had an eventful period of service. Not keen on Army discipline, Allen went AWOL and was disciplined for disobeying orders many times in his two years of service. While in New Guinea he suffered from appendicitis and dengue fever and then crashed an Army vehicle into the orderly room of the guard depot.

Notes

External links 

Profile on Collingwood Forever

1921 births
1977 deaths
Australian rules footballers from Melbourne
Collingwood Football Club players
Australian Army personnel of World War II
Australian Army soldiers
Military personnel from Melbourne
People from Collingwood, Victoria